Highline College is a public community college in Des Moines, Washington. Highline was founded in 1961 as the first community college in King County, Washington. , there were approximately 17,000 students and 350,000 alumni of the college.

History
Highline College was founded in 1961 as the first community college in King County. The current campus in Des Moines was built in 1964 with additional buildings added in following years to meet student and technology needs. The school was known as Highline College until 1967 when the Washington State Legislature passed the Community College Act of 1967, and the name became Highline Community College. In June 2014, Highline's board of trustees voted to change the name back to Highline College. Starting in the fall of 2014, Highline was approved to offer four Bachelor of Applied Science degree programs. Classes are also offered at the Marine Science and Technology (MaST) Center at Redondo Beach and additional service-area locations such as Burien and White Center.

Demographics
The demographics of Highline are diverse due to both the local population and the acceptance of international students. , 23% of all students were categorized as White, 20% are Asian, 1% are Pacific Islander, 20% African American, 12% Hispanic/Latino, less than 1% Native American, and 12% are multiracial. The total number credit and non-credit students was 15,375, while 71% of those are credit students. The student body was 60% female and 40% male.

Accreditation
The college is accredited by the Northwest Commission on Colleges and Universities. Its Nursing program is accredited by National League for Nursing Accreditation Commission. The Respiratory Care program is accredited by the Committee on Accreditation for Respiratory Care and the Commission on Accreditation of Allied Health Education Programs. The Medical Assistant program is accredited by the Commission on Accreditation of Allied Health Education Programs and the Curriculum Review Board of the American Association of Medical Assistants Endowment. The Paralegal program is approved by the American Bar Association.

Foundation
The Highline College Foundation was established in 1972 as a non-profit organization to help raise funds to improve the quality of education at Highline College. The Foundation often holds events and allows donations to be made in an effort to raise funds. With a donation of $500 the Foundation allows individuals or groups to create their own fund that others may donate to. Both students and faculty members can take advantage of the Foundation, through scholarships and grants respectively.

MaST
The Marine Science and Technology Center (MaST) is located approximately ten minutes south of the Highline College campus at Redondo Beach Park, and promotes the understanding of the South Puget Sound ecosystem.  A new facility,  large and situated on a  pier, opened in 2008.

Athletics
Highline College competes in the Northwest Athletic Conference (NWAC) as the Thunderbirds, fielding men's and women's teams for basketball and soccer, a men's wrestling team, and women's teams for golf, softball, tennis and volleyball.

CWU-Des Moines
Central Washington University has a campus facility located on Highline College's campus. There is a partnership between the schools that allows students to take classes from both Highline and CWU concurrently. Both bachelor's and master's degrees programs are available along with certification programs.

Notable alumni
 Brandon Brown - professional basketball player
Anthony Hamilton (fighter) - NJCAA All-American wrestler; professional professional mixed martial artist
Ann Rule - true crime writer
Norm Rice - Mayor of Seattle from 1989 to 1997. Rice attended Highline before transferring to the University of Washington.
Alexis Denisof - actor
Jens Pulver - professional mixed martial artist
Trevor Smith - NJCAA All-American (2002); professional mixed martial artist
Brian Scalabrine - professional basketball player and analyst for the Boston Celtics

References

External links
Official website

Community colleges in Washington (state)
Educational institutions established in 1961
Universities and colleges in King County, Washington
Seattle metropolitan area
Universities and colleges accredited by the Northwest Commission on Colleges and Universities
1961 establishments in Washington (state)